Claudinei is a given name. It may refer to:

 Valinhos (footballer) (born 1947), José Claudinei Georgini, Brazilian football manager and former footballer
 Claudinei Oliveira (born 1969), Brazilian football manager and former goalkeeper
 Claudinei da Silva (born 1970), Brazilian sprinter
 Dinei (footballer, born 1970), Claudinei Alexandre Pires, Brazilian football striker
 Claudinei Resende (born 1978), Brazilian football midfielder
 Nei (footballer, born 1980), Claudinei Alexandre Aparecido, Brazilian football striker
 Nei (footballer, born 1985), Claudinei Cardoso Félix Silva, Brazilian football right-back
 Claudinei (footballer) (born 1988), Claudinei Junio de Souza, Brazilian football defensive midfielder